Aaron Cedric Brown (born January 13, 1956) is a former professional American football player who played linebacker for six seasons for the Tampa Bay Buccaneers, Philadelphia Eagles, and Atlanta Falcons.

References

1956 births
Living people
Sportspeople from Warren, Ohio
Players of American football from Ohio
American football linebackers
Canadian football linebackers
Ohio State Buckeyes football players
Tampa Bay Buccaneers players
Philadelphia Eagles players
Atlanta Falcons players